Königsberg was the capital of East Prussia, renamed Kaliningrad in 1946.

Königsberg may also refer to:

Places 
 Königsberg (region), a government region of the Prussian province of East Prussia 1815–1945
 Königsberg, Bavaria, a town in Lower Franconia, Bavaria, Germany
 Königsberg an der Eger, German name for Kynšperk nad Ohří in the Czech Republic
 Königsberg in der Neumark, German name for Chojna, Poland
 Königsberg, German name for Kongsberg in Norway
 Königsberg in der Priegnitz, a component of Heiligengrabe in Landkreis Ostprignitz-Ruppin, Brandenburg
 Königsberg in Schlesien, German name for Klimkovice in the Czech Republic
 Königsberg, German name for Nová Baňa, Slovakia
 Königsberg, alternative name of Sarreinsberg, a component of Goetzenbruck, France
 Konigsberg, a former name of Silver Mountain, California
 Kunšperk, a settlement in the Municipality of Bistrica ob Sotli, Slovenia, known as Königsberg until 1918

Mountains 
 Königsberg (Brocken), a side peak of Brocken mountain
 Königsberg (Goslar), a mountain in Goslar
 Königsberg (North Palatine Uplands), near Wolfstein in Rhineland-Palatinate
 Königsberg (Osterhorn Group), in the Osterhorn Group, Austria
 Königsberg (Göstling Alps), in the Göstling Alps, part of the Ybbstal Alps, Lower Austria
 Königsberg (vineyard), a vineyard on the Moselle
 Kráľova hoľa in Slovakia (Königsberg in German)

Ships 
 Königsberg class cruiser (1905), four ships built between 1905 and 1907
 SMS Königsberg (1905), lead ship of the class, stationed in German East Africa at the start of World War I
 Königsberg class cruiser (1915), four cruisers built during World War I to replace the original Königsberg class, all four ships having been sunk or decommissioned
 SMS Königsberg (1915), lead ship of the class
 Königsberg class cruiser (1927), also known as the K class, a class of three light cruisers built between the two World Wars
 German cruiser Königsberg, lead ship of this class
 , a German cargo ship in service 1934–39

People with the surname 
 Woody Allen (born Allan Stewart Königsberg in 1935), American film director, actor, writer, and comedian
 Bill Konigsberg (born 1970), American author
 E. L. Konigsburg (1930–2013), American author of From the Mixed-Up Files of Mrs. Basil E. Frankweiler
 Frank Konigsberg (1933–2016), American lawyer, television producer and agent
 Nancy Koenigsberg (born 1927), American artist of fine art textiles

See also 
 Seven Bridges of Königsberg, a topology problem
 Kings Mountain (disambiguation)
 Kongsberg, a town in Norway
 Königsburg, a ruined medieval castle in the German state of Saxony-Anhalt
 Château du Haut-Kœnigsbourg, a castle in Orschwiller, Alsace, France